Fabio Albarelli (26 June 1943 – 4 October 1995) was an Italian competitive sailor.
He won a bronze medal in the Finn class at the 1968 Summer Olympics and finished in 15th place in the Soling in 1976.

References

External links
 
 
 
 

1943 births
1995 deaths
Italian male sailors (sport)
Sailors at the 1968 Summer Olympics – Finn
Olympic sailors of Italy
Olympic bronze medalists for Italy
Olympic medalists in sailing
Sailors at the 1976 Summer Olympics – Soling
Medalists at the 1968 Summer Olympics
Sportspeople from Verona
20th-century Italian people